Parhelophilus frutetorum is a European hoverfly.

Description

Habits

Distribution

References

External links

Diptera of Europe
Eristalinae
Insects described in 1775
Taxa named by Johan Christian Fabricius